Gilley may refer to:

Places

France
 Gilley, Doubs, a commune
 Gilley, Haute-Marne, a commune

United States
 Gilley, Kentucky, an unincorporated community
 Gilley, Virginia, an unincorporated community

People
 Mickey Gilley (1936–2022), American country musician
 Jeremy Gilley (born 1969), British actor turned film-maker and founder of the non-profit organization Peace One Day
 Paul Gilley (1929-1957), American country musician

See also
 Gillie (disambiguation)
 Gilly (disambiguation)